Rose Maud Talbot (September 14, 1915 – February 15, 2009) was an English-born Irish farmer and philanthropist, who emigrated to Tasmania, Australia.

Life 
Talbot was born in the large country house of Hartham Park, Wiltshire, England. Her mother was Eva Joicey and her father was Colonel Milo Talbot. Her grandfather was James Talbot, 4th Baron Talbot of Malahide. When she was five her family moved to another large house, Bifrons Park, near Canterbury in Kent. She was educated nearby but she was not expected to have a career.

In 1948 her brother inherited the family's title, estates and Malahide Castle near Dublin. He moved around as he was in the UK diplomatic service so Rose became the castle's overseer. In 1949 the King issued a Royal Warrant of Precedence declaring that she would be given the rank of the daughter of a baron even though her father had not lived long enough to inherit the title. When her brother retired they fell out and she moved out of the castle. She lived in Dublin where she became the Secretary of the Soldiers, Sailors, Airmen and Families Association (SSAFA) which helped service people to return to Ireland.

Her brother was interested in stamps and plants. He had inherited a large farm in Tasmania that had been established in the 1870s by Thomas Lister Ingham. and when he was asked if he would sell it then he went to see the property in 1952. He decided to keep it and he spent money to bring it back to be serviceable. Rose visited with him in 1955. He had an art gallery installed and he sent back botanical specimens from his travels as he did for Malahide Castle.

Her brother decided to commission a flora of Tasmania.  He died when he was 60, while cruising around the Greek islands, in 1973. This created an enormous problem as his property made the family liable to large death duties and it was Rose who inherited the estate, and the problem. She would have liked to have given valuables from the castle to the Irish State but the government would only accept property or money. She caused some controversy when she sold important furnishings to raise the money to pay the debts. She lived at the castle for three years before she ended the family's long association with the castle and gifted it to the Irish state.

Talbot moved to Tasmania where she took over the farm. She continued her brother's interest in botany and she paid for the completion of the six volume The Endemic Flora of Tasmania.

Talbot died in Tasmania on 15 February 2009.

References 

1915 births
2009 deaths
People from Tasmania
Pastoralists